Macarostola parolca is a moth of the family Gracillariidae. It is known from the Seychelles.

References

Macarostola
Fauna of Seychelles
Moths described in 1911